PT1 may refer to:
 486958 Arrokoth (New Horizons PT1), a Kuiper belt object and selected target for a flyby of the New Horizons probe
 Pratt & Whitney PT1, a free-piston gas-turbine engine
 Consolidated PT-1 Trusty, a 1930s USAAS primary trainer airplane
 Piper PT-1, primary trainer airplane.
 PT-1, a pre-World War II US Navy PT boat
 Prison Tycoon, a 2005 video game
 PT1, a paratriathlon classification

See also
 PTI (disambiguation)
 Part One